Zhi Yaqi (Chinese: 支雅琪; Pinyin: Zhī Yǎqí; born 27 March 1990) is a Chinese football player.

Club career
In 2009, Zhi Yaqi started his professional footballer career with Shenzhen Asia Travel in the Chinese Super League.  On 28 March 2009, he made his debut for Shenzhen in the 2009 Chinese Super League against Guangzhou Evergrande, coming on as a substitute for Renan Marques in the 66th minute.
In March 2010，Zhi transferred to Chinese Super League side Jiangsu Sainty .
In 2011, Zhi transferred to China League Two side Chongqing F.C.
In 2012, Zhi transferred to China League Two side Shenzhen Fengpeng.
In March 2014, Zhi transferred to China League Two side Shenyang Dongjin.

In March 2015, Zhi transferred to fellow China League Two side Baoding Yingli ETS.

Club career statistics 

Statistics accurate as of match played 24 August 2015

References

1990 births
Living people
Chinese footballers
Footballers from Tianjin
Shenzhen F.C. players
Jiangsu F.C. players
Shenyang Dongjin players
Baoding Yingli Yitong players
Hong Kong First Division League players
Chinese Super League players
Association football forwards